St. Mary's is a cathedral-style church located at 566 Elm Street in Stamford, Connecticut. The church is part of the Roman Catholic Diocese of Bridgeport.  The main building is a Gothic Revival structure, designed by Francis L. S. Mayers and completed about 1928.  It is an elegant example of French Gothic architecture, notable for the large rose window in the front-facing gable end.  The rectory is a c. 1860 Italianate villa, originally built for a member of the locally prominent Wardwell family.

The complex was added to the National Register of Historic Places in 1987.

St. Mary's Convent
The St. Mary's Convent is now the Monsignor McDermott Parish Center.

Gallery

See also
National Register of Historic Places listings in Stamford, Connecticut

References

External links 

Roman Catholic Diocese of Bridgeport
St. Mary's Convent photo

Churches on the National Register of Historic Places in Connecticut
Gothic Revival church buildings in Connecticut
Italianate architecture in Connecticut
Roman Catholic churches completed in 1860
19th-century Roman Catholic church buildings in the United States
Roman Catholic churches in Stamford, Connecticut
National Register of Historic Places in Fairfield County, Connecticut
Italianate church buildings in the United States